An amphibian is a member of the class Amphibia of ectothermic, tetrapod vertebrates

Amphibian may also refer to:
Amphibian (comics), a superhero
"Amphibian" (song), by Björk
Amphibious aircraft, an aircraft that can operate from water or land, typically a floatplane or flying boat equipped with retractable wheeled landing gear
Loening OL or Loening Amphibian, an amphibious biplane built for the US Army Air Corps and the US Navy
Mark IV Amphibian, a type of World War II period British frogman's rebreather

See also
 Amphibia (disambiguation)
 Amphibious (disambiguation)